Marovitsika Sud is a commune in Atsimo-Atsinanana Region in south-eastern Madagascar.

Following 8 villages belong to the commune:
Amboraka
Ankazolahy
Atokoboritelo
Belenalena sud
Ezira
Mahasoa
Marovitsika
Mihaikarivo

References

Populated places in Atsimo-Atsinanana